Anita West (born 1935) is a British actress and former television presenter.

Blue Peter
On 7 May 1962, she joined the British children's television show Blue Peter as co-host, following the departure of Leila Williams. She remained with the programme for only sixteen editions, the last being shown on 3 September 1962, making her one of the programme's shortest-serving presenters (other than stand-ins Ann Taylor, Tony Hart and Sandra Michaels). She voluntarily resigned from the series because of her imminent divorce (in 1962) from the musician Ray Ellington and her own worries of the inappropriateness for a presenter of a children's programme. West never divulged her reasons for leaving to the producers, who deemed her "unprofessional" for simply walking out on the show. Anita was married to Ray Ellington for six years; the couple had a son, Lance, and a daughter, Nina.

The length of time West presented Blue Peter was so short that, for several decades, she was not officially recognised as a Blue Peter presenter, only being added to the official list of presenters upon the show's fortieth anniversary in 1998. In contrast, her replacement, Valerie Singleton, ahead of whom West had come in earlier auditions, became the show's longest-serving female presenter until Konnie Huq.

Later career
After leaving Blue Peter, West appeared in such shows as Space: 1999, Crossroads as Doctor Hilary Maddox, The Saint and Lovejoy. She also briefly returned to Blue Peter in 1998 to appear in its pantomime.

In the 1970s, she was a PR hostess at the Palm Beach Casino Club in Mayfair.

She appeared in the films Impact, Shadow of Fear, Ring of Spies and Joey Boy.

References

External links
Anita West BBC Blue Peter

Blue Peter presenters
British actresses
Living people
1935 births
Place of birth missing (living people)